Indraprastham is a 1996 Indian Malayalam-language political thriller-action film directed by Haridas, starring Mammootty, Vikram, Simran, Akshay Anand, Prakash Raj and Devan in prominent roles. The film marks the debut of Simran in Malayalam cinema.

Synopsis
Chitra Narayan (Simran), a political journalist with Observer Daily in Delhi, is in love with Kiran Verma (Akshay Anand), a budding actor. She intrudes into the illegal affairs of Paul B. Issac (Devan), a Delhi-based politician. Paul B. Issac commits a murder and gets actor Kiran's face morphed onto his body in the video, whereby he traps him for the crime. Kiran is jailed under the charge of murder. Chitra gets the video tape, and she smells foul and tries to reveal the truth behind the morphing of images. She is followed by the goons of Paul. Chitra reaches Bangalore, but the goons reach there after her. She is saved by Sathish Menon (Mammootty), a software engineer.  He becomes her savior. After watching the video, Sathish realizes the truth behind the crime and decides to expose Paul B. Issac. Meanwhile, Kiran is killed. Sathish's software company suffers huge setbacks, after the illegal influence of Paul, causing huge losses. Sathish openly begins his battle for justice for Chitra.

Cast
Mammootty as Sathish Menon
Vikram as  Peter
Simran as Chitra Narayanan
Akshay Anand as  Kiran Verma
Prakash Raj as Mohan George
Devan as  Paul B. Issac
M. G. Soman as  K. N. Nair
Oduvil Unnikrishnan as Manikkoth Kunjukrishna Panicker
Nirosha as Anitha Kulkarni
Hemant Birje as Shyam Kaushik
Azeez as  Police Commissioner
Abu Salim as a mercenary
Priya Raman in the item number
Sakshi Shivanand in item number

Music
The film score is composed by Vidyasagar

Release  
The film released on 23 August 1996, and did not perform well in the box office.

The film was dubbed and released in Tamil as Delhi Darbar, with a reviewer noting "the strong cast is the main attraction".

References

External links
 

1990s Malayalam-language films
1990s political thriller films
1996 films
Political action films
Indian political thriller films
Films set in Delhi
Films scored by Vidyasagar
Films shot in Delhi
Indian action thriller films
1996 action thriller films